Sri Sarada Niketan College for Women, is a women's general degree college located in Amaravathipudur, Karaikudi, Tamil Nadu. It was established in the year 1997. The college is affiliated with Alagappa University. This college offers different courses in arts, commerce and science.

Departments

Science
Physics
Mathematics
Biochemistry
Information Technology
Computer Science

Arts and Commerce
Tamil
English
Business Administration
Commerce

Accreditation
The college is  recognized by the University Grants Commission (UGC).

References

External links

Educational institutions established in 1997
1997 establishments in Tamil Nadu
Colleges affiliated to Alagappa University